Giovanni Battista Bellandi (early 16th century)  was an Italian sculptor, active in Milan for its elaborately decorated Cathedral.

References

Renaissance sculptors
16th-century Italian sculptors
Italian male sculptors